Vavoua International School (VIS) was a boarding school operated by WEC International located east of the town of Vavoua on the road to Zuénoula. It was closed in 2002 due to political unrest in Ivory Coast.

History
Founded in 1970, the school offered excellent educational opportunities for many missionary kids (MKs) and other children from a wide variety of countries. While VIS's official language was English, students at VIS were offered correspondence classes in Dutch, German, and Korean as well as a variety of international curricula. Most VIS students were from East Asia, Africa, Europe, North America or the Pacific, and have remained in contact since the closing of the school. The VIS student body is credited with several important inventions, including Christmas bamboo trees and poultry security testing.

See also

 Christianity in Ivory Coast
 Education in Ivory Coast
 List of boarding schools

External links 
 www.wec-int.org/vis latest information

1970 establishments in Ivory Coast
Buildings and structures in Sassandra-Marahoué District
Co-educational boarding schools
Christian schools in Africa
Defunct schools in Ivory Coast
Educational institutions established in 1970
International high schools
International schools in Ivory Coast
Haut-Sassandra
Organizations with year of disestablishment missing
Religious schools in Ivory Coast
Educational institutions disestablished in 2002
Ivory Coast